He-Man is a  superhero and the main protagonist of the sword and planet Masters of the Universe franchise, which includes a toy line, several animated television series, comic books and a feature film. He-Man is characterized by his superhuman strength and in most variations, is the alter ego of Prince Adam. He-Man and his friends attempt to defend the secrets of Castle Grayskull, the planet Eternia, and the rest of the universe from the evil forces of his archenemy Skeletor.

The character was created by designer Roger Sweet, who intentionally created the character in such a way for him to be abstract and generic enough to be applied into any context and genre; Sweet also chose the name "He-Man" for being generic. Presenting three different versions of the figure to Mattel—including a soldier and a spaceman—the barbarian version of the character was chosen and developed into the character's current form.

He-Man has been singled out for the homoeroticism and gay subtext surrounding his character. Critics have noted his queer-coded nature and perceived homosexuality, including his relationships with other male characters; such as Skeletor. Furthermore, He-Man has achieved gay icon status and amassed an LGBT following—specifically amongst gay men, with the character having been noted for his sex appeal towards said group. According to various insiders and employees, Mattel is aware of He-Man's gay icon status and following, and his perception as a gay man something to which the company is receptive.

Development
In 1976, Mattel's CEO Ray Wagner declined a deal to produce a toyline of action figures based on the characters from Star Wars, due to the $750,000 license ($3,645,724.96 in 2021 dollars) required up front. Following the commercial success of the original Star Wars trilogy and its related merchandise, Mattel launched several successful competing toylines which captured the public's imagination and significantly influenced the toy market. In the race to design the next popular action figure, Roger Sweet—a lead designer for Mattel's Preliminary Design Department—realized that simplicity was the key to success. According to his 2005 book Mastering the Universe: He-Man and the Rise and Fall of a Billion-Dollar Idea, Sweet knew that if he gave the marketing department something it could sell, he had won 90 percent of the battle. Sweet stated that "to sell this [to Wagner]", he glued a Big Jim figure—another Mattel toy line—into a battle action pose, added clay to its body, and had plaster casts made. These three prototypes would later go on to become He-Man. Furthermore, to sell this toy, Sweet stated that as a powerful figure, it could be applied into any context because the character had the generic name of He-Man.

Appearances

Comics

In the illustrated books released with the first series of toys, He-Man is a barbarian from an Eternian tribe. The planet's inhabitants were dealing with the aftermath of the Great Wars, which devastated the civilizations which once ruled supreme. The wars left behind advanced machinery and weaponry, known only to select people. The Sorceress of Castle Grayskull gave He-Man some of these weapons, and he set out to defend the secrets of Castle Grayskull from the evil Skeletor. He-Man possessed one-half of the Power Sword; Skeletor had the second half, and used it as his main weapon. When joined, the two halves provide the key to Castle Grayskull. In one early illustrated story, He-Man and Skeletor united their two Power Sword halves to form the true Power Sword, defeating Trap Jaw.

He-Man and the Masters of the Universe (2012)

In June 2012, DC Comics began publishing a six-issue limited series, He-Man and the Masters of the Universe, alongside the weekly digital first series Masters of the Universe. In He-Man: The Eternity War, He-Man is shown as married to Teela.

Television

He-Man and the Masters of the Universe (1983)

In more than a few comic book and animated series He-Man's (and She Ra's) origins had been revised: his true identity was Prince Adam of Eternia, son of King Randor and Queen Marlena (an earthling), who gave birth to twins Prince Adam/He-Man and Princess Adora/She Ra (Adora was abducted by the Evil Horde led by Hordak) and ruled the Kingdom of Eternia on the planet of the same name. The Sorceress of Castle Grayskull endowed Prince Adam with the power to transform into He-Man, which he did by raising his Power Sword and proclaiming, "By the power of Grayskull..." Once the transformation was complete, he would continue, "...I have the power!" The differences between Prince Adam and He-Man were minimal; He-Man had a slightly deeper voice, a different wardrobe, and slightly darker skin and hair.

Prince Adam's pet was a cowardly green tiger named Cringer. When Adam became He-Man, he transformed Cringer into a brave armored green tiger named Battle Cat by pointing his sword at him – an ability Adam discovered accidentally during one of his transformations into He-Man. Cringer cowered in fear at seeing what Adam had become; while reassuring him that nothing had really changed, Adam pointed the sword of power at Cringer, which sent a bolt of energy toward the tiger and transformed him. Battle Cat served as He-Man's steed and fierce fighting companion ever since. in a couple of versions of He-Man, he can use his sword to change into different versions of He-Man depending on the type of battles he is in, and can also use his sword to give friends, allies (as seen in Revelation and the new CGI version of Masters of the Universe), and animals besides Cringer power and enhanced abilities.

Adam was friendly with Teela who, unbeknownst to her, was the daughter of the Sorceress and was adopted by Prince Adam's mentor Duncan/Man-At-Arms. Adam and Teela grew up together and now, as Captain of the Guard, she was entrusted to protect him. Unaware of his identity as He-Man, she saw Adam as lazy and cowardly, an act he keeps up to prevent people from discovering his secret identity. 

Man-At-Arms was He-Man's closest companion and the Eternian royal family's innovator of technology and weapons. He often unveiled new weapons or devices to help He-Man. Castle Grayskull was the source of He-Man's powers, where the Sorceress lived, who granted Adam his transformative abilities and communicated telepathically with him. To protect his family He-Man kept his double identity a secret, sharing it only with Orko, Man-At-Arms, Cringer and the Sorceress. He-Man's archenemy was Skeletor, a blue-skinned sorcerer with a yellow skull for a head. He was skilled in black magic and all forms of combat, being extremely cunning and intelligent. Skeletor was accompanied by a group of henchmen who aided his evil schemes.

The spin-off series She-Ra: Princess of Power revealed that Adam had a twin sister: Princess Adora, a leader of the Great Rebellion against Hordak on the planet Etheria. Adora, like Adam, was given the gift of the power of Grayskull and had her own sword which she used to transform into She-Ra, Princess of Power. He-Man made a number of appearances in the series.

A decade on from the cancellation of the Filmation cartoon series, Filmation's Lou Schiemer pitched a sequel series to Mattel in 1995 called "He-Ro: Son of He-Man and the Masters of the Universe" in which He-Man was now King of Eternia, married to Teela, and had a son, Dare, who inherited the Sword of Power from him, using it to become the title character He-Ro, leading his comrades into battle against a returned Skeletor. The show was ultimately not picked up, although its premise has been embraced by fans as official canon and influenced the bios for the characters in the Masters of the Universe Classics toy line.

He-Man & She-Ra: A Christmas Special (1985)

The New Adventures of He-Man (1990)

After the end of the Masters of the Universe toy line, Mattel attempted to revive interest in He-Man by producing a new toy line, entitled He-Man. The storyline in the minicomics packaged with the figures explained that He-Man had left Eternia and pursued Skeletor into the depths of space, who had set his sights on conquering the distant world of Primus, a planet with great technological resources. He-Man was shown to have relinquished the identity of Prince Adam altogether, basing himself on Primus where he led a team of defenders known as the Galactic Guardians. He-Man's appearance was retooled for the new toy line, with a space helmet and golden armor added to his attire to give him a more futuristic appearance; his sword was also redesigned.

A cartoon series was produced by Jetlag Productions to accompany the toy line, entitled The New Adventures of He-Man. Although generally following the story line from the minicomics, this series maintained the double identity of Prince Adam and He-Man. On the planet Primus, Prince Adam posed as a traveling merchant and the nephew of Master Sebrian to disguise his secret identity. His transformation oath was altered slightly, to become "By the power of Eternia..."

He-Man and the Masters of the Universe (2002)

To tie in with a new line of action figures based upon the original toyline, a new He-Man cartoon series was produced in 2002-03 by Mike Young Productions, titled He-Man and the Masters of the Universe and given the marketing subtitle "vs. the Snake Men" in its second season. This series retold the Masters of the Universe story from the beginning. He-Man's origin was told in a 90-minute series premiere, in which the 16-year-old Prince Adam was summoned to Castle Grayskull by the Sorceress to assume the identity of He-Man and his role as Eternia's defender.
The portrayal of his character in this series was consistent with Filmation's portrayal, although the character of Prince Adam was brasher and more youthfully energetic than his 1980s counterpart (conveying the image of a teenage boy saddled with the responsibility of defending a planet from evil). The Adam/He-Man character was redesigned, to make the character's secret identity more credible.

Masters of the Universe: Revelation (2021)

Masters of the Universe (CGI reboot, 2021)

In December 2019, it was announced that in addition to their other series, Netflix would also be developing a new Masters of the Universe series using CGI animation. With Rob David developing the series, producing it alongside Adam Bonnett, Christopher Keenan, Jeff Matsuda and Susan Corbin. Bryan Q. Miller serves as story editor on the series. Animation services are being provided by House of Cool and CGCG Inc.

Film

He-Man and She-Ra:The Secret of the Sword (1985 animated film)

Masters of the Universe (1987 film)

Chip 'n Dale: Rescue Rangers

He-Man and Skeletor both make cameo appearances in the 2022 film Chip 'n Dale: Rescue Rangers.

Reboot film
On April 29, 2019, actor Noah Centineo confirmed in an appearance on The Tonight Show Starring Jimmy Fallon that he would be playing He-Man in the Masters of the Universe film, which was due to begin production in July 2019 and set for a 2020 release. However, due to the ongoing COVID-19 pandemic he pulled out of casting two years later. In January 2022, it was announced that Kyle Allen had been cast in the role, with filming to begin that summer.

Merchandise

Masters of the Universe Classics (2008)
This action-figure line combined elements from the He-Man universe into a cohesive storyline with biographies on the figures' packaging. These biographies suggested that several "He-Men" have come into existence – such as Vikor (based on an early concept design for the vintage He-Man), Oo-Larr (based on the jungle He-Man from the first minicomic.  Adam takes over as King of Eternia as King He-Man, marries Teela, and they have a son named Dare.

Wife and Son
According to canon, the "main storyline" of He-Man concludes with He-Man (now King He-Man) ending up marrying his longtime sweetheart "Teela" and they have a son together named Dare, who later becomes He-Ro. The storyline was after defeating Skeletor, the couple ruled Eternia and their son's alter ego of He-Ro defeated the character called "The Unnamed One".

Powers and abilities
He-Man was characterized as possessing super speed, heightened agility, superhuman strength, increased stamina and endurance. The extent of his strength was unknown, but on one occasion he was able to hoist Castle Grayskull and throw it through an interdimensional portal. He-Man also demonstrated his strength by lifting mountains and icebergs and hurling them toward a desired target. On one occasion, he welded a broken metal chain together simply by pushing the links together. In the episode "She-Demon of Phantos", he was shown to be the only person to break Photanium (claimed by Man-At-Arms to be the strongest metal in the universe). In the comics, he was shown as being able to go one-on-one with pre-Crisis Superman. On the original action figure's packaging and in the introductory sequence of the 1980s cartoon series, He-Man is claimed to be "the most powerful man in the universe". His strength was derived from magical powers within Castle Grayskull. In the Episode of the original series "Eternal Darkness", He-Man was shown pushing a moon of Eternia into a specific orbit, and then later returning it to its original position by hand.

He can remain as He-Man for as long as he wants but if he takes too much damage or uses too much raw force, he will revert to his original form of Adam. In the 2002 series, He-Man is shown enduring the brunt of at least two large explosions, which he survives, but reverts to Adam in the process, suggesting that even He-Man has a limit as to how much abuse he can endure before his superhuman strength and stamina are exhausted. For He-Man to change back to Prince Adam he holds out his power sword, says "Let the power return!", and then He-Man and Battle Cat would change back into Prince Adam and Cringer. In the 2002 series, He-Man was shown enduring the brunt of the Ram Stone of Zalasia (a gem whose mystic force could pierce any barrier or topple any obstruction). He survived, but reverted to Adam in the process. In combat against the snake-god Serpos, He-Man was struck by the giant snake's tail and sent crashing into a mountain. When he fell to the ground, he was again in Adam's form; this suggested that there was a limit to He-Man's strength and stamina. 

He-Man's prowess is not limited to strength; he is also depicted as being extremely quick and acrobatic. His speed has been demonstrated by running fast enough to escape massive explosions and moving his arms fast enough to counteract the winds of a tornado. He-Man is also shown leaping great heights, usually flipping through the air several times before landing safely on his feet. 

It is also suggested that He-Man possesses some form of telepathic powers as well. There were several instances in the original TV series where He-Man was able to communicate and sense the presence of the Sorceress by telepathy. It was also shown that he has the ability to communicate with his sister She-Ra across great distances. 

He-Man as a character is largely non-violent, only resorting to combat as a last resort. He used his intellect more often, preferring to outsmart his adversaries; most violent actions typically consisted of body-throws. In accordance with broadcast standards of the period, in the Filmation cartoon, He-Man could not use his sword as an offensive weapon or punch or kick anyone. He was only allowed to destroy robotic enemies. The 1987 film and 2002 series, however, showed him fighting more aggressively. He-Man was depicted as a leader – most noticeably in the film adaptation, where he is referred to as the "leader" of the resistance. Skeletor intended to force him into submission, rather than killing him – fearing that doing the latter would turn He-Man into a martyr who would inspire others to fight.

He-Man's primary weapon was his sword, but he also used other weapons (such as a laser-gun in the film and the mini-comics, a battle axe, a shield, and other equipment - including vehicles) while battling his foes. His sword, apparently indestructible, could deflect bolts of energy. His sister Adora's Sword of Protection was not entirely indestructible; the stone in the hilt was once damaged, preventing her from transforming. In addition, the sword gave him the ability to transform from Prince Adam into He-Man (and back) by utilizing the powers of Castle Grayskull. He also uses his sword to transform Cringer into Battle Cat. In the earliest versions of the story (for example, the first four minicomics) He-Man's primary weapon was an axe, because the sword was intended to serve as a plot device that would only be used in order to gain entry into Castle Grayskull. The breastplate on his power harness was made of an Eternian mineral (corodite) which helped add to his physical strength. The origin of the power harness was explained in the episode "Evil-Lyn's Plot" (written by Paul Dini).

Gender analysis
According to a book by Michael G. Cornelius, He-Man is considered a narrow definition of masculinity. Cornelius cited He-Man as the literal "strongest man in the universe" and says that his chief adversary Skeletor's primary weapon is his intellect, mirroring a Superman/Lex Luthor dichotomy.

Queer/LGBT analysis

David Chlopecki argues that Prince Adam's appearance, such as his pink spandex clothing,  conforms to gay stereotypes, while NPR said the character's appearance adds to the show's gay subtext because He-Man's outfit resembles those of leather subculture, and including a bondage harness, which in the 1980s was considered to be homoerotic imagery. Attention has also been paid to Adam's transformation into He-Man through his "fabulous powers" and phallic sword.

The character's double life has also been noted as queer subtext. According to Battis, Adam's need to "hide his true identity as [He-Man]" is one of the show's key queer aspects. British newspaper The Daily Telegraph said the character's dual identity represents a man's struggle to accept his sexuality; Prince Adam is closeted and has a secret while He-Man is "out-and-proud". Writing for The Johns Hopkins News-Letter, Matt Johnson described the series' depiction of He-Man as a "thinly veiled treatise on the state of gay male sexuality in the eighties".

Adam B. Vary said the original cartoon series contains gay subtext, which the live-action movie Masters of the Universe turns into explicit text, portraying a "tragic unrequited romance between He-Man and Skeletor", singling out Skeletor's "warped obsession" with He-Man and He-Man never showing an interest in women. He-Man's relationship with Man-at-Arms has also been acknowledged as being homoerotic.

Gay icon and fandom
He-Man's homoeroticism and implied homosexuality resulted in the character and show drawing a queer audience when the cartoon first aired, with the character being now viewed as a gay icon. Men's Health said gay men were one of the three core groups that were consumers of He-Man toys. ND Stevenson, the creator, showrunner, and executive producer of She-Ra and the Princesses of Power (2018–20) has also stated that He-Man—alongside She-Ra—is a gay icon, and the character's LGBT fanbase has been credited as helping provide support for the inclusion of openly queer characters in the reboot.

Sex appeal
When development on a live-action remake of the film was first-announced, LGBT lifestyle magazine Out also described the original series as "one of the gayest ... cartoons of all time", and said the 1987 film "turn[ed] an entire generation of boys at least a little gay". Instinct magazine's Gerald Biggerstaff described the original cartoon as being quite popular with gay men who grew up in the 1980s and 90s, and that for many of them, He-Man "prompted [their] gay awakenings". In 2003, HX Magazine editors compiled a list of must-see television series with attractive male leads, with He-Man as himself and based on his appearance in the 2002 reboot—the only animated character to make the list—being described as the "object of all our childhood wet dreams". British magazine Gay Times compiled a list of cartoon characters their editors were attracted to while growing up; He-Man was at the top of the list, taking note of Dolph Lundgren's depiction of him in the live-action film. In the same publication, actor Andrew Hayden-Smith said 2016 he realized he was gay while playing with his He-Man figure as a child, being attracted to the character's physique—particularly his pecs.

Response from Mattel and insiders
According to Mark Morse, Mattel's director of global marketing from 2008 to 2017, by 2018, when a "Laughing Prince Adam" action figure was released, the question of He-Man's sexuality and whether a future installment in the franchise should have him be openly gay had not been discussed. In an interview with gay lifestyle online magazine Queerty, Rob David and Tim Sheridan, who work on the Masters of the Universe: Revelation, discussed the character's homoeroticism and gay fanbase. According to David, who is an executive producer of Revelation and Mattel's Vice President of Creative Content, Mattel is "very comfortable" with He-Man's gay audience and the perception of the character as a gay man.

References

Bibliography

External links

  (1983–1985 series)
  (1987 live action film)
  (1990–1991 series)
  (2002 series)

1980s toys
Action figures
Animated human characters
Comics characters introduced in 1981
Extraterrestrial superheroes
Fictional characters introduced in 1981
Fictional characters who can move at superhuman speeds
Fictional characters who use magic
Fictional characters with energy-manipulation abilities
fictional characters with immortality
Fictional characters with superhuman durability or invulnerability
Fictional characters with superhuman strength
Fictional princes
Fictional shapeshifters
Fictional swordfighters
Fictional twins
Male characters in animated series
Male characters in film
Masters of the Universe Heroic Warriors
Superheroes
Television characters introduced in 1983